Tashkuiyeh (also Romanized as Tāshkūiyeh; also known as Tāj Kūh and Tāj Kū’īyeh) is a village in Sabzdasht Rural District, in the Central District of Bafq County, Yazd Province, Iran. At the 2006 census, its population was 93, in 23 families.

References 

Populated places in Bafq County